Syed Golam Kibria (died on May 31, 1996) was a Bangladeshi journalist and politician.  He was awarded Ekushey Padak in 2016 by the Government of Bangladesh.

Career and personal life
Kibria was a Language-movement activist in 1952, for which he was posthumously awarded Ekushey Padak, the second highest civilian award in Bangladesh, at 2016.

Kibria served as the acting editor of the Daily Azad and Daily Bhorer Kagoj.

Kibria was the father-in-law of Bangladeshi minister and Awami League politician Shajahan Khan. He was also the grandfather-in-law of Bangladesh Awami League MP Soto Monir.

Kibria died at 1996, he left behind a wife, 4 daughters and 3 sons.

References

1996 deaths
Bangladeshi journalists
Recipients of the Ekushey Padak
1933 births